Like a Girl may refer to:

 Like a Girl (commercial), often shown as #LikeAGirl, a commercial for Always feminine hygiene products
 "Like a Girl", a song by Lizzo on the album Cuz I Love You